Potacocowa Creek is a stream in the U.S. state of Mississippi.

Potacocowa Creek is a name derived from the Choctaw language purported to mean "broken sumac". A variant name is "Potacocowah Creek".

References

Rivers of Mississippi
Rivers of Carroll County, Mississippi
Mississippi placenames of Native American origin